Dreams is the debut album by German-Norwegian indie pop band the Whitest Boy Alive. In 2006, it was released on Service Records as well as Asound/Bubbles. Early pressings of the album, such as the Norway release by the label Smalltown Supersound, carry a different track sequencing to later pressings which have since become the standard for reprints. The band's frontman, Erlend Øye, was performing an electronic arrangement of the track "Don't Give Up" with the duo Röyksopp from as early as 2001.

Track listing

First pressing sequencing
The Service Records CD (SERV027) lists this track order as:

International release sequencing
The Asound/Bubbles CD (ASCD01) lists this track order is:

Charts

References

2006 debut albums
The Whitest Boy Alive albums
Service (record label) albums